Nicolás Pereira defeated Guillaume Raoux in the final, 7–6(7–4), 6–2 to win the boys' singles tennis title at the 1988 Wimbledon Championships.

Seeds

  Jason Stoltenberg (quarterfinals)
  Johan Anderson (first round)
  Andrei Cherkasov (semifinals)
  Todd Woodbridge (second round)
  Goran Ivanišević (quarterfinals)
  Nicolás Pereira (champion)
  Richard Fromberg (semifinals)
  Zeeshan Ali (second round)
  Piet Norval (third round)
  Roberto Jabali (second round)
 n/a
  Patricio Arnold (third round)
  Guillaume Raoux (final)
  Luis Herrera (third round)
  Nicklas Kulti (second round)
 n/a

Draw

Finals

Top half

Section 1

Section 2

Bottom half

Section 3

Section 4

References

External links

Boys' Singles
Wimbledon Championship by year – Boys' singles